Eddlethorpe is a hamlet in the Ryedale district of North Yorkshire, England.

In 1823 Eddlethorpe (then Eddlethorp), was in the civil parish of Westow, and the Wapentake of Buckrose in the East Riding of Yorkshire. Population at the time was 62, with occupations including two farmers, one of whom was the Surveyor of Highways.

References

Villages in North Yorkshire